Chemical Engineering and Biotechnology Abstracts (CEABA-VTB) is an abstracting and indexing service that is published by DECHEMA, BASF, and Bayer Technology Services, all based in Germany. This is a bibliographic database that covers multiple disciplines.

Subject coverage
Subject coverage includes engineering, management, manufacturing plants, equipment, production, and processing pertaining to various disciplines. The fields of interest are bio-process engineering, chemical engineering, process engineering, environmental protection (including safety), fermentation, enzymology, bio-transformation, information technology, technology and testing of materials (including corrosion), mathematical methods (including modeling), measurement (including control of processes), utilities (including services). Also covered are production processes and process development. CAS registry numbers are also part of this database.

References

Bibliographic databases in engineering
Chemical engineering journals
Biotechnology